The spot-winged rosefinch (Carpodacus rodopeplus), also known as the spotted rosefinch, is a species of finch in the family Fringillidae.  It is found in India and Nepal. Sharpe's rosefinch was formerly considered conspecific with it. Its natural habitat is subtropical or tropical high-altitude shrubland.

References

Rasmussen, P.C. 2005. Revised species limits and field identification of Asian rosefinches. BirdingAsia number 3: 18–27.
Rasmussen, P.C., and J.C. Anderton. 2005. Birds of South Asia. The Ripley guide. Volume 2: attributes and status. Smithsonian Institution and Lynx Edicions, Washington D.C. and Barcelona

spot-winged rosefinch
Birds of North India
Birds of Nepal
spot-winged rosefinch
Taxonomy articles created by Polbot